University of Santiago can refer to:

 University of Santiago de Cuba, in Santiago de Cuba, Cuba
 University of Santiago, Chile, in Santiago, Chile
 University of Santiago de Compostela, in Santiago de Compostela, Galicia, Spain
 Universidade de Santiago, in Assomada on the island of Santiago, Cape Verde